Hwang Young-hee is a South Korean actress and model. She is known for her roles in dramas, While You Were Sleeping, My Healing Love, and Nokdu Flower. She also appeared in movies such as The Witness, Stray Dogs, May 18, and Mother.

Biography and career
She was born on March 22, 1969 in South Jeolla Province, Mokpo in South Korea. She attended Mokpo National University and graduated with a Bachelor in science. In 1987, she joined Big Boss Entertainment, starting off in many plays and theater performances. Later in 2006, she made her debut as an actress and appeared in several dramas such as, While You Were Sleeping, My Healing Love, Nokdu Flower and The King: Eternal Monarch. She also appeared in a number of movies The Witness, Stray Dogs, May 18 and Mother.

Filmography

Television series

Film

Theatre

Awards and nominations

References

External links
 
 

1969 births
Living people
21st-century South Korean actresses
South Korean female models
South Korean television actresses
South Korean film actresses